The Arman Oil Field is an oil field located in Mangystau Province. It was discovered in 1994 and developed by Lukoil. The oil field is operated and owned by Lukoil and Royal Dutch Shell.

References 

Oil fields of Kazakhstan